Orú is a village in Tibú Municipality, Norte de Santander Department in Colombia.

Climate
Orú has a tropical rainforest climate (Af) with heavy to very heavy rainfall year-round.

References

Populated places in the Norte de Santander Department